Globulosoma is a genus of harvestmen in the family Sclerosomatidae from Nepal.

Species
 Globulosoma gandakense J. Martens, 1987
 Globulosoma montivaga J. Martens, 1987

References

Harvestmen
Harvestman genera